Merlapaka Gandhi  (born Merlapaka Che Guevara) is an Indian film director and screenwriters who works primarily in Telugu cinema.  In 2013, he made his directorial debut with Venkatadri Express. He later directed Express Raja (2016), and Krishnarjuna Yudham (2018) starring Nani.

Early life 
Merlapaka was born in the village of Vedulla Cheruvu near Renigunta, Andhra Pradesh in a Telugu-speaking family. His father Merlapaka Murali was a Telugu language novelist and a contemporary of author Yandamuri Veerendranath. Merlapaka was initially given the name Che Guevara because his father was fond of Marxist revolutionary Che Guevara. As their friends and relatives found it difficult to pronounce the name, after watching film Gandhi. Murali changed his five-year old son's given name to 'Gandhi' in honour of independence activist Mahatma Gandhi.

Merlapaka was schooled in Tirupati and graduated with a Bachelor of Technology from Allagadda.

Film career 
Merlapaka wanted to become a film director since the 10th standard. After completing his graduation, he convinced his father to let him join a Cinematography course at the L. V. Prasad film institute in Chennai, Tamil Nadu, although, he eventually pursued a direction course there. Later on, he started writing stories and directed a short film. Having received a good response upon its release online, he then started developing the script for Venkatadri Express which was his debut film as a director.

Filmography

References

External links
 
 

Living people
21st-century Indian film directors
Telugu film directors
Telugu screenwriters
Film directors from Andhra Pradesh
Screenwriters from Andhra Pradesh
1982 births